Jean-Paul Roussillon (5 March 1931 – 31 July 2009) was a French actor. He appeared in more than 80 films and television shows between 1954 and 2008. He starred in the film Playing 'In the Company of Men', which was screened in the Un Certain Regard section at the 2003 Cannes Film Festival. He won the César Award for Best Supporting Actor for his role in A Christmas Tale. For years Roussillon had been battling lung cancer and died on 31 July 2009 in Auxerre, France.

Partial filmography

 La chair et le diable (1954) - Apo Ancelin
 Deadlier Than the Male (1956) - Amédée
 L'amour descend du ciel (1957) - Jean
 The Fox of Paris (1957) - Francois, Yvonne's Brother
 Le mariage de Figaro (1959) - Grippe-Soleil
 La 1000eme fenêtre (1960) - Boutain
 Weekend at Dunkirk (1964) - La gouape / Blackguard
 Une affaire d'hommes (1981) - Le juge Dauzat
 The Trout (1982) - Verjon
 La guerre des demoiselles (1984) - Le juge
 Outlaws (1985) - Le fermier belliqueux
 Monsieur de Pourceaugnac (1985) - Oronte
 He Died with His Eyes Open (1985) - Léonce
 Elsa, Elsa (1985) - Albert, le producteur
 My Brother-in-Law Killed My Sister (1986) - Somptueux Larbin
 États d'âme (1986) - Arnolli, le syndicaliste
 Twist again à Moscou (1986)
 Les clowns de Dieu (1986) - Garniks
 Hôtel de France (1987) - Jean Trillat
 Maladie d'amour (1987) - Jacques
 Alouette, je te plumerai (1988) - Vergne's friend
 Comédie d'amour (1989) - Henri
 Je t'ai dans la peau (1990) - Bébert, gardien de la Bourse du travail
 Plein fer (1990) - Napoléon
 La fille du magicien (1990) - Nadir
 Le Brasier (1991) - Dalmas
 Le secret de Sarah Tombelaine (1991) - Emile
 Cherokee (1991) - Oncle Fernand
 List of Merite (1992) - Albert Croquebois
 La Fille de l'air (1992) - Raymond
 Revenge of the Musketeers (1994) - Planchet
 Les truffes (1995) - Le vigneron
 Oui (1995) - Monsieur Arthur
 Drancy Avenir (1997) - La voix de l'explorateur (voice)
 On connaît la chanson (1997) - Father
 Le plus beau pays du monde (1999) - Le directeur du théâtre
 Une hirondelle a fait le printemps (2001) - Jean
 Mischka (2002) - Mischka
 L'idole (2002) - Roger Castellac
 Playing 'In the Company of Men' (2003) - Henri Jurrieu
 Black Mor's Island (2004) - Mac Gregor (voice)
 Kings and Queen (2004) - Abel Vuillard
 Zone libre (2007) - Maury
 A Christmas Tale (2008) - Abel - Junon's husband

References

External links

1931 births
2009 deaths
Deaths from lung cancer in France
French male film actors
French male television actors
Male actors from Paris
Sociétaires of the Comédie-Française
20th-century French male actors
21st-century French male actors
French male stage actors
French National Academy of Dramatic Arts alumni
Best Supporting Actor César Award winners